David Leslie Stapleton (born January 16, 1954) is a former Major League Baseball player who played for the Boston Red Sox from 1980 to 1986. Stapleton attended Robertsdale High School then University of South Alabama. He lives in Daphne, Alabama.

Professional career
Stapleton was selected by the Boston Red Sox in the tenth round (231st overall) of the 1975 amateur baseball draft and over the next five years worked his way up the Red Sox minor league system playing for Winter Haven, Bristol, and Pawtucket.

He made his first appearance for the Red Sox on May 30, 1980. During his time with the Red Sox, he primarily served as a utility player, covering first base, second base, shortstop and third base as well as playing in the outfield and serving as designated hitter.

From 1984 to 1986, Stapleton only played 82 games for the Red Sox.

During Game 6 of the 1986 World Series, Red Sox manager John McNamara left Buckner in the game rather than replace him with Stapleton for defensive purposes, leading to the Mookie Wilson ground ball that went through Buckner's legs, giving the New York Mets a come-from-behind win in the tenth inning. The Mets went on to win the Series four games to three.

After the 1986 season, Stapleton became a free agent and signed with the Seattle Mariners, but was released on March 31, 1987, prior to the start of the regular season.

In his career, Stapleton batted .271 (550-2028), with 41 home runs, 224 RBI, 238 runs, 118 doubles, eight triple, six stolen bases, a .310 on-base percentage, and 807 total bases for a .398 slugging average.

Stapleton played 7 years in the major leagues (1980–1986) and amazingly, his batting average went down every year he played (.321, .285, .264, .247, .231, .227, .128)

References

External links

Box score of his last game from The Baseball Almanac

1954 births
Living people
Baseball players from Alabama
Major League Baseball infielders
Major League Baseball first basemen
Boston Red Sox players
Pawtucket Red Sox players
South Alabama Jaguars baseball players
People from Fairhope, Alabama
International League MVP award winners